Isochrysis is a genus of haptophytes. It includes the species Isochrysis galbana, Isochrysis litoralis and Isochrysis maritima. Until recently this genus was also thought to contain the 'T-iso' algae frequently used in aquaculture; that species has been reclassified as Tisochrysis lutea.

References

Haptophyte genera